Kuh Sefid-e Sofla (also Romanized as Kūh Sefīd-e Soflá; also known as Kūh Sefīd-e Pā’īn) is a village in Pain Velayat Rural District, Razaviyeh District, Mashhad County, Razavi Khorasan Province, Iran. At the 2006 census, its population was 125, in 28 families.

References 

Populated places in Mashhad County